An Invitation is the fourth single by Russian singer-songwriter Lena Katina's debut solo studio album This Is Who I Am. The song was written by Katina, Maria Abraham, Jorg Kohring and Sven Martin, who also produced it.

Track listing
 Promo CD
 "An Invitation"
 "An Invitation" (Music Video)

 Remixes
 "An Invitation" (Album Version) 3:53
 "An Invitation" (Loaded Fist Remix) 4:26
 "An Invitation" (Tim Resler Remix) 4:05
 "An Invitation" (DJ Trojan & Alan Belini Remix) 3:36
 "An Invitation" (Ilya Baronov Remix) 3:33
 "An Invitation" (Zetandel Chill Mix) 4:43
 "An Invitation" (The Tipsy Remix) 4:24
 "An Invitation" (Alex Molchanov Remix) 4:02

Music video
The music video for "An Invitation" was shot at location in the Church Palace in Rome, Italy during Katina's trip to an album presentation concert at Auditorium Parco della Musica in November 2014, while she was three months pregnant. Set in a luxurious, sexy atmosphere, the video shows Katina as a mysterious, almost angelical woman trying to convince a man to come to a pure world and escape a lustful life; he's seen surrounded by models.

The video premiered on May 12, 2015 at a press conference in the Church Palace with Katina and the whole video team explaining its concept.

The video won the 2015 Accolade Global Film Competition "Award of Excellence" and the 2015 Apex Short Film + Music Video Festival award for "Best Soft-rock Music Video".

Release history

References

2014 singles
Lena Katina songs
2014 songs